Marie Ekorre (born 11 December 1952) is a former Swedish film actress and glamour model. During the 1970s, she starred in a number of German and Swedish sex comedies. She was Penthouse magazine's Penthouse Pet (i.e. the centerfold) for its March 1974 issue.

Selected filmography
 Lockfågeln (1971)
 Love Bavarian Style (1973)
 Nøglehullet/The Keyhole (1974)
 Around the World with Fanny Hill (1974)
 Private Pleasures (1976)
 Three Bavarians in Bangkok (1976)

References

Bibliography 
 Tom Milne. The Time Out Film Guide. Longman, 1989.

External links 
 

1952 births
Living people
Glamour models
Swedish film actresses
People from Dalarna County